Joseph Craig Colquitt (born June 9, 1954) is a former American football punter who spent eight seasons in the National Football League (NFL) with the Pittsburgh Steelers (1978–1981, 1983–1984) and Indianapolis Colts (1987). He was a member of two Super Bowl championship teams with the Steelers in 1978 and 1979.

Colquitt's brother, Jimmy Colquitt, was a punter for the Seattle Seahawks in 1985. He is also the father of two current NFL punters, Dustin and Britton Colquitt. All four played college football at the University of Tennessee. Both his sons won Super Bowl rings, Britton with the Broncos and Dustin with the Chiefs. Craig was inducted into the Greater Knoxville Hall of Fame July 16, 2009. Craig Colquitt is also the author of the children's book: "JoJo! What Happened To Your Hair?".

References

External links
 http://www.govolsxtra.com/news/2009/jul/03/just-for-kicks/
 https://www.nytimes.com/2014/02/01/sports/football/for-the-colquitt-punters-4th-down-is-family-time.html
https://CraigColquitt.com
Order Children's Book:  https://craigcolquitt.com/order-the-book/

1954 births
Living people
American football punters
Tennessee Volunteers football players
Pittsburgh Steelers players
Indianapolis Colts players
Players of American football from Knoxville, Tennessee
Colquitt family
National Football League replacement players